Heraldo is a masculine given name. People with that name include:

Heraldo Bezerra (born 1946), Spanish-Brazilian footballer
Heraldo do Monte (active from 1960), Brazilian guitar player
Heraldo Muñoz (born 1948), Chilean permanent representative to the United Nations

See also
 Heraldo de Aragón, Spanish daily newspaper
 Heraldo de Madrid, defunct Spanish newspaper
 El Heraldo (disambiguation), multiple newspapers
 Giraldo